Maria Rita Brondi (5 July 1889 – 1 July 1941) was an Italian guitarist, lutenist, singer, composer, and music historian.

Early life 
Maria Rita Brondi was born in Rimini. She studied guitar with Luigi Mozzani, and with Francisco Tárrega; she studied voice with Paolo Tosti in England. Tárrega dedicated a solo guitar composition to Brondi.

Career 
Brondi toured in Europe as a guitarist and singer, known for singing Italian regional folk songs. She was also a composer of guitar works. She wrote a book on the history of the guitar, titled Il liuto e la chitarra (1926), which was published in several editions through the twentieth century. Julian Bream mentioned her as making early lute recordings, in company with Suzanne Bloch and Diana Poulton.

Personal life 
Brondi died at age 51 in Rome, in 1941. Her compositions are still played and recorded, for example on a collection titled Guitar Music by Women Composers (2009), by Dutch guitarist Annette Kruisbrink.

References

External links 
 La Biblioteca Di Maria Rita Brondi.  Collana a cura di Maurizio Mazzoli, a Facebook page about Brondi.
 "Melodia del Sannio" by Brondi, performed by Annette Kruisbrink, on YouTube.

1889 births
1941 deaths
Italian musicians
Italian composers
Italian women composers
Italian women writers
Music historians
People from Rimini